SAP Business ByDesign (ByD) is a cloud enterprise resource planning software (Cloud ERP) that is sold and operated as software as a service by SAP SE. It is designed for small and medium-sized enterprises. The software is designed to provide business processes across application areas from financials to human resources with embedded business analytics, mobility, e-learning, and support.

SAP Business ByDesign is built on the principles of a service oriented architecture (SOA). Integration between business capabilities is accomplished via messages. The underlying technology stack is a multi-tenancy enabled SAP NetWeaver stack, leveraging SAP's in-memory HANA database.

SAP Business ByDesign is used by almost 10.000 companies in more than 140 countries and supports 41 languages (13 standard and 28 partner translated, including simplified Chinese, Japanese, Korean, Polish, Hebrew). It is localized for 65 countries (standard localizations, pre-localizations and partner localizations). In addition customers and partners can create custom country and language versions using the Localization and Language Toolkit provided by SAP. Examples for the 72 localizations by customers or partners are Taiwan, Malaysia, Vietnam, Chile and Peru.

Business areas and scenarios 
SAP Business ByDesign processes are grouped by application areas interlinked by so-called business scenarios. Scenarios provide business processes which span across companies, partners, departments and its employees. The main application areas and core business scenarios are:

Financial management (FIN): Cash and Liquidity Management, Financial Closing, Fixed Asset Management
Customer relationship management (CRM): Marketing to Opportunity, Field Service and Repair, Order to cash (projects, standard service, materials)
 Project management and professional service automation (PSA / PRO): Project Management
Supplier relationship management and procurement (SRM): Procure to pay (stock and non stock)
Supply chain management (SCM): Demand Planning, Strategic sourcing, Make to stock, Physical Inventory Management,
Human resources management (HRM): Expense Reimbursement, Resource Management, Time and Labor Management
Business analytics (BA or BI)
Executive support and compliance management.

History 
SAP announced SAP Business ByDesign on 19 September 2007 during an event in New York. It was previously known under the code name "A1S". Since its initial and general available release in 2007 (so-called feature pack 1.2) it has been enhanced in quarterly releases.

See also 
Cloud computing
Comparison of accounting software
Customer relationship management
List of ERP software packages
List of embedded CRM
List of SAP products
Project management
Supply chain management

References

External links 

ERP software
Customer relationship management software
Accounting software
Cloud applications
As a service
SAP SE